Phillipp Mwene (born 29 January 1994) is an Austrian professional footballer who plays as a right back for Eredivisie club PSV and the Austria national team.

Club career

VfB Stuttgart II 
He made his first appearance for VfB Stuttgart II on 20 April 2013 in the 3. Liga against SV Wacker Burghausen.

1. FC Kaiserslautern 
In 2016, Mwene signed with 1. FC Kaiserslautern. In the 2017–18 season he was a consistent performer at right-back contributing 4 goals and 7 assists in 31 appearances while the club was relegated from the 2. Bundesliga.

Mainz 05 
In May 2018, Bundesliga side Mainz 05 announced Mwene would join the club on a free transfer from Kaiserslautern for the 2018–19 season.

PSV 
On 27 May 2021, PSV announced Mwene would join the club on a free transfer from Mainz 05, effective from 1 July.

International career
Mwene was born in Vienna and holds dual citizenship of Kenya and Austria. He is a youth international for Austria. He was called up to the preliminary Austria squad for UEFA Euro 2020.

He made his debut for the Austria national football team on 4 September 2021 in a World Cup qualifier against Israel, a 2–5 away loss. He started the game and played the whole match.

Career statistics

Club

International

Honours
PSV
 KNVB Cup: 2021–22
 Johan Cruyff Shield: 2021, 2022

References

External links

 Profile at the PSV Eindhoven website
 Phillipp Mwene at kicker.de 
 
 OEFB Profile

1994 births
Living people
Footballers from Vienna
Austrian footballers
Austria youth international footballers
Austria under-21 international footballers
Austria international footballers
Austrian people of Kenyan descent
Association football defenders
Bundesliga players
2. Bundesliga players
3. Liga players
Eredivisie players
VfB Stuttgart II players
1. FC Kaiserslautern players
1. FSV Mainz 05 players
PSV Eindhoven players
Austrian expatriate sportspeople in Germany
Austrian expatriate footballers
Expatriate footballers in Germany
Expatriate footballers in the Netherlands